Radik Zhaparov (born February 29, 1984) is a Kazakh ski jumper who has competed since 2003. At the 2006 Winter Olympics in Turin, he finished 11th in the team large hill and 26th in the individual normal hill events. At the FIS Nordic World Ski Championships, Zhaparov has finished 11th in team events three times (2005: large, normal; 2007: large) and 24th in the individual normal hill (2007) events.

Zharparov's best individual World Cup finish was 11th in a large hill event in Finland in 2007. His best individual career finish was second in an FIS Cup normal hill event in Austria, also in 2007.

External links

1984 births
Kazakhstani male ski jumpers
Olympic ski jumpers of Kazakhstan
Living people
Ski jumpers at the 2006 Winter Olympics
Asian Games medalists in ski jumping
Ski jumpers at the 2003 Asian Winter Games
Ski jumpers at the 2011 Asian Winter Games
Asian Games silver medalists for Kazakhstan
Asian Games bronze medalists for Kazakhstan
Medalists at the 2003 Asian Winter Games
Medalists at the 2011 Asian Winter Games